The Western Australian Government Gazette is the government gazette of Western Australia.

It has been published since 1836. Between 1878 and 1989 it was known as the Government Gazette of Western Australia.

Editions from approximately 1915 onwards are available in electronic format on the State Law Publisher's website in PDF format.

Some archives and libraries in Western AustraliaBattye Library, State Records Office of Western Australia, and Reid Library at the University of Western Australiahave parts of the series as hard copies but in most cases only part of the range is openly available.

See also
 InterSector, history of various government instrumentalities and information about government funded bodies
 List of British colonial gazettes

References

External links
Official website

Government of Western Australia
Publications established in 1836
Government gazettes of Australia
1836 establishments in Australia